Christian Gaudin may refer to:

 Christian Gaudin (politician) (born 1950), member of the Senate of France
 Christian Gaudin (handballer) (born 1967), French team handball player
 Christian Gaudin (film editor), French film editor